"Legal Tender" is the first single released by the B-52's from the 1983 album Whammy!.

Description
The lyrics of "Legal Tender" tell a story about counterfeiting American dollars by outfitting a basement with "heavy equipment" and learning to print bills because of rising prices. A companion music video was produced featuring Cindy Wilson and Kate Pierson in wigs of many shapes and colors.

"Legal Tender" is an upbeat synthesizer-based track with a drum machine and hand-clap rhythm. The lead vocals are shared by Pierson and Wilson. The song appears as the opening track on the band's third studio album Whammy!, signifying that the band had altered their sound quite significantly for the album.

"Legal Tender" was performed live during the Whammy! tour, with Keith Strickland on synthesizer and with horn parts added.

Chart performance
The single was the band's third Billboard Hot 100 chart entry, peaking at #81. The song also reached #9 on the U.S. Hot Dance Club Play chart, along with album tracks "Whammy Kiss" and "Song for a Future Generation."

The song was an airplay and club hit in Brazil in 1984, and was performed during the band's set at the 1985 Rock in Rio music festival. When the band toured Brazil in 2009 and omitted the song from their live set, fans chanted for them to play it. Because of the song's popularity in Brazil, it appeared on the Brazilian version of Time Capsule: Songs for a Future Generation, on which it replaced "52 Girls." It was also included on the Nude on the Moon compilation some years later.

Chart positions

References

1983 singles
The B-52's songs
Songs written by Fred Schneider
Songs written by Kate Pierson
Songs written by Keith Strickland
Songs written by Cindy Wilson
Warner Records singles
Works about money forgery
1983 songs